{{Album ratings
| rev1 = Allmusic
| rev1Score = <ref name="allmusic">{{cite web|url=https://www.allmusic.com/album/melba-1976-mw0000868906|title=Melba|work=Allmusic|accessdate=2021-11-15}}</ref>}}Melba'' is the sixth album by singer Melba Moore, released in late 1976.

Track listing
"The Way You Make Me Feel" (Charles Kipps)
"Good Love Makes Everything Alright" (Richard Harris, Van McCoy)
"The Long and Winding Road" (John Lennon, Paul McCartney)
"Ain't No Love Lost" (Curtis Mayfield)
"The Greatest Feeling" (Richard Harris, Van McCoy)
"Mighty Clouds of Joy" (Buddy Buie, Robert Nix)
"(I Need) Someone" (Charles Kipps)
"So Many Mountains" (Joe Cobb, Van McCoy)

References

1976 albums
Melba Moore albums
Buddah Records albums
Albums with cover art by Joel Brodsky